The Upper Black Eddy–Milford Bridge is a free bridge over the Delaware River, owned and operated by the Delaware River Joint Toll Bridge Commission. The bridge carries Bridge Street, connecting CR 519 in Milford, Hunterdon County, New Jersey, with Pennsylvania Route 32 in Upper Black Eddy, Bucks County, Pennsylvania. The bridge currently has a 55-ton weight limit, the heaviest free bridge on the Delaware.

History

Following a great flood in 1841, the original wood timbered, covered bridge was built in 1842, to accommodate business needs that ferries could not handle.  The bridge was severely damaged by the flood of 1903 in which it lost one of its three wooden spans.  The ferry was put back into service while the bridge was repaired however, and the wood spans remained in use until replaced by the current steel bridge in 1933; only the stone piers were reused at that time. The bridge charged tolls until 1929.

Two more floods damaged the bridge, including the Flood of 1955 in the aftermath of both Hurricane Connie and Hurricane Diane. The 1955 flood left the bridge under seven feet of water, and while not completely destroying the bridge, did cause structural damage.

See also
 List of crossings of the Delaware River

References

External links

 NJ Skylands Delaware River Crossings

Delaware River Joint Toll Bridge Commission
Road bridges in Pennsylvania
Bridges over the Delaware River
Bridges in Hunterdon County, New Jersey
Bridges completed in 1842
Bridges in Bucks County, Pennsylvania
Road bridges in New Jersey
Former toll bridges in New Jersey
Former toll bridges in Pennsylvania
1842 establishments in New Jersey
Steel bridges in the United States
Interstate vehicle bridges in the United States
1842 establishments in Pennsylvania